Chervonopopivka is a village in Sievierodonetsk Raion in the Luhansk Oblast (province) of Ukraine.

History
The village of Chervonopopivka was historically located in the Kreminna Raion which, as of 18 July 2020, was abolished and merged into the Sievierodonetsk Raion.

During the 2022 Russian invasion of Ukraine, the village was captured and occupied by Russian forces within the month of March 2022. Ukrainian forces would recapture the village in October 2022, then the Russian Ministry of Defense reported that the village was recaptured by Russian forces on 11 December 2022, but on the 15th of December the village was recaptured by Ukraine according to ISW and the General Staff of the Armed Forces of Ukraine.

Notable people
  (1914–1944), commander and Hero of the Soviet Union

References

Notes

Villages in Sievierodonetsk Raion